The Midland Conference was an IHSAA-sanctioned conference located in North Central and Northeast Indiana. Except for having three members between 1981 and 1982 notwithstanding, the conference stayed between four and six members through its lifetime. The conference consisted mostly of private schools, with one public school and one military academy holding membership at some point.

History
The conference was formed in 1971 with 6 schools: Bethany Christian, Divine Heart, Huntington Catholic, Kewanna, Wawasee Prep, and White's. Divine Child left after the first year, and was replaced by Marion Bennett in 1973-74. Wawassee Prep closed in 1975, leaving the conference at 5 until 1981. That year, Kewanna was consolidated into Caston Jr.-Sr. High School, and Bethany Christian became independent. The remaining schools (Huntington Catholic, Marion Bennett, and White's) continued the conference unofficially for a year, then Fort Wayne Christian (later Fort Wayne Keystone) joined in 1982, and Howe Military joined two years later. This lineup only lasted one season, as Fort Wayne Canterbury replaced the closing Huntington Catholic. Bethany Christian joined for the 1987-88 school year, and were replaced by Lakeview Christian in 1988. Once Marion Bennett closed in 1993, the conference entered its most stable lineup, not changing until Lakewood Park Christian joined in 2000. Canterbury left in 2002, followed by Lakewood Park leaving in 2009, leaving four schools. Keystone closed after the 2009-10 school year, and with Howe, Lakeview, and White's unable to find replacement schools, the conference disbanded after that season.

Membership

Membership Timeline

Membership timeline

Resources 
 IHSAA Conferences
 IHSAA Directory
 Fort Wayne Christian All-Time Team Results

Indiana high school athletic conferences
High school sports conferences and leagues in the United States
Indiana High School Athletic Association disestablished conferences